"Monument" is a song by the Norwegian supergroup Keiino. It was released as a digital download and for streaming on 14 January 2021 by Caroline International. The song placed second in Melodi Grand Prix 2021, the Norwegian pre-selection for the Eurovision Song Contest 2021. The song was written by Alexander Nyborg Olsson, Alexandra Rotan, Fred Buljo, Rüdiger Schramm and Tom Hugo.

Background
This is the second time the group are taking part in Melodi Grand Prix after winning in 2019, the group represented Norway in the Eurovision Song Contest 2019 with the song "Spirit in the Sky". They qualified to the final and received the highest points from the televote with a total of 291 points, although combined with their score from the jury they finished in 6th place, with 331 points. Talking about returning to compete on Melodi Grand Prix, Alexandra Rotan said, "We can’t wait to be back! We absolutely love the MGP and Eurovision world, and it feels like home. Being in KEiiNO has really been life changing for me." Talking about the song, Tom Hugo said, "We really believe 'Monument' has that little something extra that will appeal to both the public and the juries. It is time to bring the Eurovision Song Contest back to beautiful Norway, and we really hope the Norwegian people will vote us through and give us that chance."

Music video
The release of the music video for "Monument" was published on Keiino's YouTube channel on 4 February 2021. It was filmed at different locations in Norway during October and November 2020 by Tobias Aasgaarden with production executed by Tom Hugo and Keiino, editing by Alex Holm and grading by Håvard Småvik. Additional video footage was taken by Natural Light Earth. Recording took place at Lindesnes, Lysebotn, Haukeli, Vøringsfossen, Skåla, Slogen, Hoddevik, Vestkapp, Lofoten, Kautokeino and Alta.

Melodi Grand Prix
On 11 January 2021, it was announced that the group would participate in the Melodi Grand Prix 2021 final with the pre-qualified song. They performed the song during the first heat on 16 January 2021. The song reached the final four, and entered the gold duel at the finale on 20 February 2021, placing second in the duel to TIX.

Personnel
Credits adapted from Tidal.
 Rüdiger Schramm – producer, composer, lyricist, associated performer, programming
 Tom Hugo – producer, composer, lyricist, associated performer, executive producer, vocals
 Alexander Nyborg Olsson – composer, lyricist
 Alexandra Rotan – composer, lyricist, associated performer, vocals
 Fred Buljo – composer, lyricist, associated performer, vocals
 Andrea Christiane Berglihn – associated performer, violin
 Armando Toledo Aribu – associated performer, violin
 Håvard Kværne Hansen – associated performer, drums
 Kjell Åge Stoveland – associated performer, viola
 Leonardo Sesenna – associated performer, cello
 Markus Bastoe – associated performer, guitar
 Thomas Berlin – associated performer, programming
 Georg Tanderø – mastering engineer, studio personnel
 Christer André Cederberg – mixer, studio personnel
 Jaran Gustavson – recording engineer, studio personnel

Charts

Certifications

References

2021 singles
Melodi Grand Prix songs of 2021
Sámi-language songs
English-language Norwegian songs